Serbian Wooden Churches consists about 80 wooden religious buildings constructed from end 17th up to mid 19th centuries during Ottoman Age located in present-day Serbia and Bosnia.

These churches were mostly located in the forests far from main roads. In order to preserve their identity and religion from the Ottoman Empire, the Orthodox residents built their churches from wood, so that they could easily overnight transfer them to other locations. The wooden churches are small structures of simple construction with authentic roof, without decoration and apses. Most of them are of skeleton type, with walls made of grooved boards and some made of logs with rectangular cross section. On the corner, the logs are connected with a flattened flap. The walls vary and rarely reached the height of a man. Also, churches did not reached the height of a trees. The roofs are very steep for faster drainage of rain water. At the corner, the faces of the roof are regularly rounded. In this way, a corner on the roof is avoided which is unsuitable for the roof, and at the same time a semi-elliptical roof of the frontal walls is obtained which provides a better protection from atmospheric effects. This additionally gives a specific esthetical vision of the structure. These buildings do not have a ceiling so the roof structure in the interior is fully visible. Openings are very small so the inside of the church is rather dark.

Bosnia and Herzegovina and Serbia is specific regarding the number of mosques with wooden minarets remaining from the Ottoman Empire.

Gallery

See also
Zapis

External links
 Two wooden churches in Bosnia, Petar Momirović (In Serbian)
 Wooden churches of West Bosnia, Petar Momirović (In Serbian)
 Small wooden church in village Kućani on YouTube
 Wooden mosque in village Priluk
 Wooden church in village Gorobilje on YouTube

Serbian Orthodox Church
Wooden buildings and structures
Wooden churches
Churches in Serbia
Serbian culture